The Aerovons were an American rock band from St Louis, Missouri formed in 1966.

History
They were formed in 1966 in St Louis, Missouri by Tom Hartman. 

A 1967 demo record was heard by a representative of Capitol Records. In spite of an offer to record in Los Angeles, the group held out hope that they could record in London, the recording home of their heroes, The Beatles. In 1968 they traveled to London twice, receiving offers from both EMI and Decca. In 1969, the band returned to London and recorded an album at EMI studios, now known as Abbey Road. Guitarist Bob Frank, an original member of the band, left the group just before they went to London to record, due to personal issues. He was replaced briefly by Phil Edholm, a guitarist introduced to the group only a few months before leaving for England. Unfortunately, he did not work out as well 
and was released by the group soon after arriving in England.

Once the album was finished, the band returned to St. Louis where more personal problems between a group member and his family caused the group to splinter. EMI decided not to release the album.  EMI invited Tom Hartman to come to England and restart, but Hartman felt that moving to England was too great a step at his age. The partnership with EMI was then dissolved. The album was not released until a CD release in 2003 by RPM.

The album was engineered by Beatles' engineers Norman Smith, Geoff Emerick, Phil McDonald, and Alan Parsons, who also played recorder on one of the album's tracks.

Members
Tom Hartman - piano, guitar
Bob "Ferd" Frank - guitar
Mike Lombardo - drums
Gary Goelzhauser- drums
Bill Lombardo - bass
(*Phil Edholm - guitar)

In Summer of 2021 a new release called "A Little More" came out to positive reviews with several songs on it written just after their return from England, along with a song called "Swinging London" which speaks about their experience in England.

Discography
1969 - Resurrection
 World Of You
 Resurrection
 Say Georgia
 With Her
 Quotes And Photos
 Words From A Song
 Bessy Goodheart
 Something Of Yours
 She's Not Dead
 The Years
 Everything's Alright
 The Children
Bonus tracks [2003]: 
 Train [single A-side]
 Song For Jane [single B-side]

2021 - A Little More
 Stopped!
 Shades of Blue
 Me and My Bomb
 You & Me
 So Sorry
 A Little More
 The Way Things Went Tonight
 Swinging London

References

External links
Official Website
Album description
Answers.com group story
Technicolor Web of Sound internet radio station
National Public Radio podcast

American psychedelic rock music groups
Musical groups established in 1966
1966 establishments in Missouri